Maureen MacDonald (born 1954) is a Canadian academic and politician. She represented the riding of Halifax Needham in the Nova Scotia House of Assembly from 1998 to 2016. She served as the interim leader of the Nova Scotia New Democratic Party from November 23, 2013 to February 27, 2016.

Early life and career
A native of Antigonish, MacDonald graduated in 1979 with a MSW from the Maritime School of Social Work at Dalhousie University.  She was employed as a social worker at the Nova Scotia Hospital (Adolescent Services) and later was a faculty member at her alma mater where she taught social policy and community development.  MacDonald also worked at Dalhousie Legal Aid, the North End Clinic and the North End Parent Resource Centre.

Political career
MacDonald was first elected as MLA for Halifax Needham in the 1998 provincial election, after having previously run in the same riding in 1984 and 1988. She was subsequently re-elected in the 1999, 2003, 2006, 2009 and 2013 provincial elections.

MacDonald sought the leadership of the NS NDP in 2000, finishing a strong third.

On June 19, 2009 MacDonald was appointed to the Executive Council of Nova Scotia where she served as Minister of Health as well as Minister of Health Promotion and Protection. On May 30, 2012, Premier Darrell Dexter shuffled his cabinet, appointing MacDonald as Minister of Finance. On May 10, 2013 MacDonald was appointed Minister of African Nova Scotia Affairs.

MacDonald was one of only seven NDP MLAs returned in the 2013 provincial election in which the Dexter government was defeated. On November 16, 2013, it was announced that MacDonald would become the party's interim leader when Dexter steps down as leader on November 23, 2013.

On April 12, 2016, MacDonald announced she was resigning as MLA.

Electoral record

|-

|New Democratic Party
|Maureen MacDonald
|align="right"| 3,391
|align="right"| 44.03
|align="right"| -23.80
|-

|Liberal
|Chris Poole 
|align="right"| 3,115
|align="right"| 40.45
|align="right"| +19.22
|-

|Progressive Conservative
|Mary D.S. Hamblin
|align="right"| 834
|align="right"| 10.83
|align="right"| +4.65
|-

|align="right"| 361
|align="right"| 4.69
|align="right"| -0.08
|}

|-

|New Democratic Party
|Maureen MacDonald
|align="right"|5,337
|align="right"|67.83
|align="right"|
|-

|Liberal
|Graham Estabrooks
|align="right"|1,670
|align="right"|21.23
|align="right"|
|-

|Progressive Conservative
|Jason Cameron
|align="right"|486
|align="right"|6.18
|align="right"|
|-

|}

|-

|New Democratic Party
|Maureen MacDonald
|align="right"|4,438
|align="right"|60.62
|align="right"|
|-

|Progressive Conservative
|Andrew Black
|align="right"|1,330
|align="right"|18.17
|align="right"|
|-

|Liberal
|Dr. Errol Guam
|align="right"|1,220
|align="right"|16.66
|align="right"|
|-

|}

|-

|New Democratic Party
|Maureen MacDonald
|align="right"|3,709
|align="right"|50.26
|align="right"|
|-

|Liberal
|Mike Rogers
|align="right"|2,178
|align="right"|29.51
|align="right"|
|-

|Progressive Conservative
|Linda Carvery
|align="right"|1,377
|align="right"|18.66
|align="right"|

|}

|-

|New Democratic Party
|Maureen MacDonald
|align="right"|3,525
|align="right"|44.95
|align="right"|
|-

|Progressive Conservative
|Linda Carvery
|align="right"|2,185
|align="right"|27.86
|align="right"|
|-

|Liberal
|Mike Rogers
|align="right"|1,970
|align="right"|25.12
|align="right"|

|}

|-

|New Democratic Party
|Maureen MacDonald
|align="right"|4,837
|align="right"|58.51
|align="right"|
|-

|Liberal
|Gerry O'Malley
|align="right"|2,506
|align="right"|30.31
|align="right"|
|-

|Progressive Conservative
|Atho Kartsaklis
|align="right"|924
|align="right"|11.18
|align="right"|
|}

|-

|Liberal
|Gerry O'Malley
|align="right"|3,469
|align="right"|41.91
|align="right"|
|-

|New Democratic Party
|Maureen MacDonald
|align="right"|2,693
|align="right"|32.53
|align="right"|
|-

|Progressive Conservative
|Randy Dewell
|align="right"|2,116
|align="right"|25.56
|align="right"|
|}

|-

|Progressive Conservative
|Edmund Morris
|align="right"|3,173
|align="right"|39.97
|align="right"|
|-

|New Democratic Party
|Maureen MacDonald
|align="right"|2,514
|align="right"|31.67
|align="right"|
|-

|Liberal
|Walter Fitzgerald
|align="right"|2,208
|align="right"|27.81
|align="right"|
|-

|Labour
|Bernice Kaizer
|align="right"|44
|align="right"|0.55
|align="right"|
|}

References

External links
 Official website
 Members of the Nova Scotia Legislative Assembly
 NDP profile

1954 births
Nova Scotia New Democratic Party MLAs
Leaders of the Nova Scotia CCF/NDP
Women MLAs in Nova Scotia
Living people
Members of the Executive Council of Nova Scotia
People from Antigonish, Nova Scotia
Female Canadian political party leaders
Finance ministers of Nova Scotia
Nova Scotia Ministers of Health
21st-century Canadian politicians
21st-century Canadian women politicians
Women government ministers of Canada
Female finance ministers